Beverley Taylor Sorenson (April 13, 1924 – May 27, 2013) was an American education philanthropist and advocate for the promotion of arts in elementary schools.

Personal life

Sorenson was born in Salt Lake City, Utah. She was the daughter of Frank Campbell Taylor and Bessie Elinor Taylor, and the fifth of six children. She was a member of the Church of Jesus Christ of Latter-day Saints.

During her upbringing, Sorenson danced and played the piano. She attended Irving Junior High and East High School. In 1945, she graduated from the University of Utah with a bachelor’s degree in education. That same year, Sorenson moved to New York City and became a kindergarten teacher.

There, she met James LeVoy Sorenson and they were married the next summer on July 23, 1946 at the Logan Utah Temple. They had eight children and settled in Salt Lake City. At the time of her passing they had 49 grandchildren and 65 great-grandchildren. Sorenson died on May 27, 2013.

Career
From 1945 to 1946, Sorenson was a schoolteacher at a Quaker school in New York. In 1975, Sorenson became the owner and manager of ExCelCis Cosmetics/LeVoys Fashions. From 1989 to 1995 she was the owner and manager of the Continental Beauty College.

Sorenson became the founder of Art Works for Kids in 1995 and the co-founder of the Sorenson Legacy Foundation in 2005.

In 2008, the Utah State Legislature adapted Sorenson’s arts-focused teaching model to integrate arts into elementary education. In her honor, they named it the Beverley Taylor Sorenson Arts Learning Program.

Sorenson Legacy Foundation
Sorenson was a philanthropist and supported many causes through the Sorenson Legacy Foundation.  Among those causes, the foundation donated 45 million dollars to support fine arts instruction for children and teachers. 
She established endowments for elementary arts education at seven universities: 
 Brigham Young University
 Additionally The Sorenson family's gift to the David O. McKay School of Education supports the BYU ARTS Partnership to increase the quality and quantity of arts education in local elementary schools.
 University of Utah
 Utah State University
 Utah Tech University
 Southern Utah University
 Weber State University
 Westminster College.

Recognitions
 The Beverley Taylor Sorenson Arts and Education Complex at The University of Utah, Built in 2014.
 The Beverley Taylor Sorenson Center for the Arts, a building at Southern Utah University built in 2016. 
 Honorary Doctorates from Southern Utah University, Salt Lake Community College, University of Utah, Utah State University, and Westminster College.

Awards 
 Award for Arts Achievement and Excellence for the International Council of Fine Arts Deans
 Living Legacy Award from the Boys and Girls Club
 The Eli and Edythe Broad Award for Philanthropy in the Arts from Americans for the Arts.

References

External links
 Art Works for Kids

American women philanthropists
1924 births
2013 deaths
20th-century American philanthropists
20th-century American businesswomen
20th-century American businesspeople
Businesspeople from Salt Lake City
21st-century American women
20th-century women philanthropists